Braveheart is a 1995 film directed by and starring Mel Gibson.

Braveheart or Brave Heart may also refer to:

Film and TV
Braveheart (1925 film), a 1925 silent Western film
"Brave Heart" (House), an episode of the medical drama TV series House
"Brave-ish Heart", an episode of the science-fiction TV series Class
Brave Heart Lion, the leader of the Care Bear Cousins
A Brave Heart: The Lizzie Velásquez Story, a 2015 documentary film

Music
 Brave Heart, song by Ayumi Miyazaki featured in the 1999 anime Digimon Adventure
 Bravehearts, East Coast hip hop group
 Braveheart (Ashanti album), 2014
 Braveheart (soundtrack), soundtrack to the 1995 film by James Horner
 Brave Heart (Kim Hill album), 1991
 Brave Heart (Thom Schuyler album), 1983
 Brave Heart (Wang Feng album), 2007
 "Braveheart" (song), a 2014 song by Neon Jungle
"Brave Heart", song by Scooters Union

Other
 Brave Hearts BC, a Malawian basketball club
 Worcester Bravehearts, a summer collegiate baseball team based in Worcester, Massachusetts
 Braveheartbattle, an annual extreme sport event in Germany
 75014 Braveheart, a preserved BR Standard Class 4 4-6-0 steam locomotive

See also
Brave Hearts (disambiguation)